The Jeep Gladiator may refer to:

 Jeep Gladiator (SJ), a pickup truck made by Jeep from 1962–1988, known as the Jeep J-Series after 1971
 Jeep Gladiator (JT), a pickup truck made by Jeep from 2019 onwards